Love for Rent is a 2005 American-Colombian romantic comedy film directed by Shane Edelman.  It stars Angie Cepeda, Ken Marino, Nora Dunn, and Martita Roca.

Plot
Sofia (Angie Cepeda) is a Colombian college student who is struggling with immigration issues in Los Angeles and decides to become a surrogate mother for a wealthy couple.

Cast
Angie Cepeda as Sofia
Ken Marino as Dr. Neil Gardner
Martita Roca as Monica
Nora Dunn as Helen Bauman
Jim Piddock as Frank Bauman
Max Burkholder as Max
Brad Rowe as Jesse
Richard Speight Jr. as George
Hunter Johnson as Zoe

Awards
New York International Latino Film Festival: Won “Audience Award” for Best Feature Film (2005)

Independent reviews
Variety: Love for Rent
Film Intuition: Love for Rent
DVD Verdict: Love for Rent

References

External links

2005 films
2005 romantic comedy films
Colombian comedy films
American romantic comedy films
2000s American films